Dianthus seguieri, common name Sequier's pink, is a herbaceous perennial plant of the genus Dianthus of the family Caryophyllaceae.

Etymology
The genus name Dianthus derives from the Greek words for divine ("dios") and flower ("anthos"), while the species name seguieri honors the French botanist Jean-François Séguier (1733 – 1784).

Description
Dianthus seguieri is a hemicryptophyte scapose plant reaching  in height. This carnation has green lanceolate leaflets and pink flowers, with purple markings in the centre. The flowering period extends from June through September. The fruits are capsules with several brown seeds.

Distribution
This species is present in southern and central Europe, mainly in Spain, France, Germany, Italy, and Switzerland.

Habitat

Gallery

References

External links
 Biolib
 Hlasek
 Flores Alpes

seguieri